Žanko Savov (born 14 September 1965) is a Macedonian football coach and former striker.

Playing career
Born in Udovo, Valandovo, SR Macedonia, back then within SFR Yugoslavia, he started his career in the Yugoslav Second League playing with FK Belasica and FK Pelister between 1988 and 1991.  By 2016 he is listed among FK Vardar legends at club official website.  He played with Vardar between 1991 and 1995 having won three national championships and two cups.  Vardar official website considers him as the player that dominated Macedonian football at the first three seasons of the Macedonian First Football League.  He was also the player of the match at the final of the first edition of the Macedonian Cup as he provided Vardar the honor of conquering the trophy by scoring the only and winning goal at the last minute of the game against FK Pelister.

Besides playing in Far East in South Korean K-League side Jeonbuk Hyundai Dinos between 1995 and 1998, he also played in Serbian side FK Radnički Niš.

Honours
Vardar
Macedonian First League: 3
Winner: 1992–93, 1993–94, 1994–95
Macedonian Cup: 2
Winner: 1993, 1995
Cementarnica 55
Macedonian Cup: 1
Winner: 2003

References

External sources

 

1965 births
Living people
People from Valandovo Municipality
Association football forwards
Macedonian footballers
FK Belasica players
FK Pelister players
FK Vardar players
Jeonbuk Hyundai Motors players
FK Radnički Niš players
FK Cementarnica 55 players
Yugoslav Second League players
Macedonian First Football League players
K League 1 players
First League of Serbia and Montenegro players
Macedonian expatriate footballers
Expatriate footballers in South Korea
Macedonian expatriate sportspeople in South Korea
Expatriate footballers in Serbia and Montenegro
Macedonian expatriate sportspeople in Serbia and Montenegro
Macedonian football managers
FK Borec managers
FK Osogovo managers